(For a similar sounding film of the same year see Paris (1929 film))

Paris Bound is a 1927 play by Philip Barry. It was made into a film in 1929, directed by Edward H. Griffith and starring Ann Harding and Fredric March.

Plot
Jim Hutton and Mary Archer are liberal-minded lovers content to remain faithful to each other in spirit only without need of a marriage certificate. However, they eventually do wed. Among the wedding guests is the young composer Richard Parrish, hardly disguising his admiration for the bride, and Noel Farley, whose passion is exceeded only by the pain of losing Jim to another woman. A child is born to them. When Jim goes off to Europe on a business trip, Mary declines to accompany him. Noel, who owns a villa at Antibes, lures Jim into a rendezvous. Meanwhile, Mary has an affair with Richard. Learning of Jim's rendezvous, she considers a Paris divorce so as to marry Richard. When Jim unexpectedly returns, he tells Mary of his affair with a French woman. Mary is devastated, for she would never believe that her husband would actually sleep with another woman. In the end their mutual love is confirmed, and they decide to adopt traditional marriage morals and remain monogamous.

Production history
The play ran on Broadway at the Music Box Theatre, from December 27, 1927 to July 1928, for 234 performances. The production was directed by Arthur Hopkins. This is the play's only Broadway production to date, according to IBDB.
In 1929 the play ran at Lyric Theatre, London, England with Herbert Marshall, Edna Best and Laurence Olivier.

Cast
Ann Harding - Mary Hutton
Fredric March - Jim Hutton
Carmelita Geraghty - Noel Farley
Leslie Fenton - Richard Parrish
George Irving - James Hutton, Sr.
Charlotte Walker - Helen White
Hallam Cooley - Peter
Juliette Crosby - Nora Cope
Ilka Chase - Fanny Shipman
Rose Tapley - Julie

References

External links

1927 plays
1929 films
Plays by Philip Barry
Broadway plays
American films based on plays
American black-and-white films
Pathé Exchange films
1920s English-language films
Films directed by Edward H. Griffith
1920s American films